The 2017 Philadelphia Eagles season was the franchise's 85th season in the National Football League (NFL), their 15th playing their home games at Lincoln Financial Field and the second under head coach Doug Pederson. Philadelphia won its first-ever Super Bowl title, the franchise's first championship since 1960. They defeated the New England Patriots in Super Bowl LII.

The Eagles improved from their 7–9 record from 2016, reaching a record of 13–3, and tying their 2004 season for the most wins in a season franchise history, though the 1949 team and the 1960 team had higher winning percentages. They, along with the Minnesota Vikings, Pittsburgh Steelers, and New England Patriots were involved in a 4-way tie for 1st overall. The Steelers won the tiebreaker over the Vikings based on head-to-head victory, the Patriots won the tiebreaker over the Steelers based on head-to-head victory, and the Eagles won the tiebreaker over the Patriots based on record against common opponents. In these tiebreakers taking effect, the Eagles were statistically the best team in the 2017 season. Their win against the Los Angeles Rams allowed them to clinch the division title for the first time since 2013 (first in the Pederson/Wentz era), but came with the loss of Carson Wentz to a torn ACL. A close win against the New York Giants in Week 15 helped the Eagles clinch a first-round bye for the first time in 13 years, and a Christmas Night home win over the Oakland Raiders allowed the Eagles to clinch home-field advantage throughout the playoffs for the first time since 2004.

The Eagles defeated the Atlanta Falcons 15–10 in the Divisional Round and routed the Minnesota Vikings 38–7 in the NFC Championship. The win against the Falcons in the divisional round was their first playoff win since 2008, and their first at home since 2006. The Eagles were the first No. 1 seed in the playoffs since the NFL instituted playoff seeding in 1975 to be an underdog in the Divisional Round, and were also an underdog in the Conference Championship. In total, six Eagles players were selected for the Pro Bowl, including four first-time recipients. However, none of them participated due to preparations for Super Bowl LII.

The Eagles defeated the New England Patriots by a score of 41–33 in Super Bowl LII for their first Super Bowl victory in franchise history. It was also their fourth NFL Championship, and their first league title since 1960. This was the second time the Eagles and Patriots battled in a Super Bowl; when they met in Super Bowl XXXIX, the Patriots won 24–21. Backup quarterback Nick Foles was named Super Bowl MVP. The Eagles defeated both Super Bowl teams from the previous NFL season (the New England Patriots and the Atlanta Falcons) in the playoffs, the third team to beat both of them this season, after the Carolina Panthers and Miami Dolphins. They also defeated both teams who had beaten them in their only two previous Super Bowl appearances: the Oakland Raiders in the regular season, who beat them in Super Bowl XV, and the Patriots in the Super Bowl, who previously beat them in Super Bowl XXXIX. The Eagles became the first team since the 1995 Dallas Cowboys to avenge a Super Bowl loss against a team who defeated them in a prior Super Bowl matchup.

Roster changes

Free agents

Free agent signings

Departures

Trades
 April 4: The Eagles traded the 74th pick in the 2017 NFL Draft to the Baltimore Ravens to acquire Timmy Jernigan and the 99th pick in the 2017 NFL draft.
 July 26: Guard Allen Barbre was traded to the Denver Broncos in exchange for a 2019 seventh-round draft selection.
 August 11: The Eagles traded wide receiver Jordan Matthews and their 2018 third-round draft selection to the Buffalo Bills in exchange for cornerback Ronald Darby.
 August 28: Long snapper Jon Dorenbos was traded to the New Orleans Saints in exchange for a 2019 seventh-round draft selection.
 October 31: At the trade deadline, the Eagles traded a 2018 4th round draft pick to the Miami Dolphins for running back Jay Ajayi.

Draft

Notes
 The Eagles traded their original 2017 first-round selection (No. 12 overall), their first-, third- and fourth-round selections in 2016, as well as a 2018 second-round selection to the Cleveland Browns, in exchange for the Browns' 2016 first-round selection and the Browns fourth-round compensatory selection (No. 139 overall).
 The Eagles acquired an additional first-round selection, along with a 2018 fourth-round selection in a trade that sent quarterback Sam Bradford to the Minnesota Vikings.
 The Eagles traded their third-round selection (No. 74 overall) to the Baltimore Ravens for DT Timmy Jernigan and one of the Ravens third-round selections (No. 99 overall).

Staff

 Assistant director of player personnel – Andy Weidl
 Vice president of football operations and strategy – Alec Halaby
 Senior director of college scouting – Anthony Patch
 Director of college scouting – Ian Cunningham
 Assistant director of college scouting – Mike Bradway
 Director of pro scouting – Dwayne Joseph
 Assistant director of pro scouting – Brandon Brown
 Director of football administration – Jake Rosenberg
 Football operations executive – Brian Dawkins
 Player personnel executive – T.J. McCreight
 Player personnel executive college/pro – Trey Brown

|Head Coaches=
 Head coach – Doug Pederson

|Offensive Coaches=
 Offensive coordinator – Frank Reich
 Quarterbacks – John DeFilippo
 Running backs – Duce Staley
 Wide receivers – Mike Groh
 Tight ends – Justin Peelle
 Offensive line – Jeff Stoutland
 Assistant offensive line/tight ends/run game – Eugene Chung
 Offensive quality control/quarterbacks – Press Taylor
 Offensive quality control/offensive line – T. J. Paganetti

|Defensive Coaches=
 Defensive coordinator – Jim Schwartz
 Defensive line – Chris Wilson
 Linebackers – Ken Flajole
 Secondary – Cory Undlin
 Safeties – Tim Hauck
 Defensive quality control/defensive line – Phillip Daniels
 Defensive quality control/secondary – Dino Vasso
|Special Teams Coaches=
 Special teams coordinator – Dave Fipp
 Assistant special teams – Matthew Harper

|Coaching Support Staff=
 Coaching assistant – Spencer Phillips
 Coaching assistant/linebackers – Ryan Paganetti
 Coaching assistant – Trent Miles

|Strength and Conditioning=
 Head strength and conditioning – Josh Hingst
 Assistant strength and conditioning – Keith Gray
 Strength assistant – Ben Wagner
 Director of sports science and reconditioning – Shaun Huls
}}

Final roster

Preseason

Regular season
The Eagles began their 2017 season on the road against the Washington Redskins and won 30–17. However, the team lost the following week to the Kansas City Chiefs 27–20 in Doug Pederson's return to face his mentor and the team's former coach, Andy Reid. The Eagles then went on a nine-game win streak which consisted of dominant home wins over the Arizona Cardinals, San Francisco 49ers, Denver Broncos and Chicago Bears, and close road wins in Carolina and against the Chargers. However, their winning streak came to an end at the hands of the Seattle Seahawks in Week 13 by a score of 24–10 in Seattle.  Philly bounced back the following week and won 43–35 over the Los Angeles Rams, which gave them the NFC East title, despite Carson Wentz tearing his ACL during the game, causing Nick Foles to finish off the game and become starter for the rest of the season. Rams quarterback Jared Goff was seen post-game walking over to Eagles head coach Doug Pederson inquiring of Carson Wentz’s welfare. In his first start against the New York Giants, the Eagles trailed 20–7, but Foles threw four touchdowns for a close 34–29 win over the Giants to help the Eagles claim a first-round bye in the 2017 postseason. Foles then began to struggle in Week 16 against the Oakland Raiders, throwing a touchdown and an interception and frequently missing his receivers. As a result, the Eagles defense and special teams had to carry the offensive line for a 19–10 win on a cold Christmas night to seal home-field advantage throughout the NFC playoffs. The Eagles went on to lose a meaningless Week 17 game to the Dallas Cowboys in a shutout score of 6–0 in Nate Sudfeld's debut as an Eagle, and they finished with a record of 13–3, tying their 2004 season for their best regular season record.

Schedule

Note: Intra-division opponents are in bold text.

Game summaries

Week 1: at Washington Redskins

The Eagles kicked off the 2017 season on the road against the Redskins. The Eagles started off with two touchdown passes from Carson Wentz to give them a 13–0 lead. (Kicker Caleb Sturgis missed an extra point after the second touchdown.) However, the Redskins came back with a Ryan Kerrigan pick six and a touchdown pass from Kirk Cousins to running back Chris Thompson to give them a 14–13 lead late in second quarter. The lead was very short lived, however, as the Eagles responded with a field goal to give them a 16–14 lead at the half. The third quarter only consisted of field goals. The Eagles led 22–17 at the end of the third quarter. In the fourth quarter, Kirk Cousins fumbled the ball which Eagles defensive end Fletcher Cox recovered for a touchdown to seal an Eagles victory. This was the Eagles first win against the Redskins since September 2014, ending a five-game losing streak to their division rival. This was also the Eagles first win at FedExField since 2013.

With the win, the Eagles started 1–0 for the sixth time in their last seven season openers.

Week 2: at Kansas City Chiefs
In Week 2, Doug Pederson faced off for the first time against his mentor, Andy Reid, as the Eagles traveled to Arrowhead Stadium to take on the Kansas City Chiefs. In a surprisingly defensive dominated game, the Chiefs led 6–3 at halftime, following a missed field goal to close out the first half by Eagles rookie kicker Jake Elliott. The Eagles took a 10–6 lead in the third quarter, with Carson Wentz finding his new wide receiver, Alshon Jeffery for their first touchdown connection of the year. Chiefs rookie running back Kareem Hunt answered with a 53-yard touchdown run, and fourth quarter touchdowns by Chiefs tight end Travis Kelce and Hunt opened up the lead to 27–13 with just over 2 minutes remaining in the game. Wentz led the Eagles on a scoring drive, finding Nelson Agholor in the back of the end zone with 8 seconds left in the game. The Eagles recovered the ensuing onside kick, but a Hail Mary pass to end the game fell incomplete. Eagles running back LeGarrette Blount had 1 carry for zero yards in the game, and Pederson received heat post game for not running the ball enough. The Eagles fell to 1–1 on the season.

Week 3: vs. New York Giants

Heading into this game, there were many questions on the run game especially on LeGarrette Blount as well as the offensive line who have struggled through the first two games. Plus, the Eagles were dealing with injuries on defense to safety Rodney McLeod, cornerback Ronald Darby and backup safety Corey Graham leaving Malcolm Jenkins and Chris Maragos the only healthy safeties.

Despite all of the setbacks, The Eagles hosted the 0–2 Giants who had only scored 13 points through the first two weeks of the season. Both teams started off in slow fashion, with no first quarter points. A LeGarrette Blount 1-yard touchdown run in the second quarter were the only points of the first half, after the Eagles stopped the Giants from reaching the end zone from 1 yard out to close out the first half. Coming out in the third quarter with a 7–0 lead, the Eagles added the only points of the third quarter with Carson Wentz finding tight end Zach Ertz for a 3-yard touchdown. The Eagles defense (who were playing a solid game) broke down in the fourth quarter allowing the Giants to score 21 unanswered points to start the fourth quarter, as quarterback Eli Manning found his all pro wide receiver Odell Beckham Jr. twice for touchdowns, and second year wide receiver Sterling Shepard once for a 77-yard touchdown. Fletcher Cox left the game with a calf injury. Eagles rookie running back Corey Clement ran for a 15-yard touchdown to tie the score at 21. After exchanging field goals, Wentz and the Eagles offense took over, looking to move into field goal range. Wentz connected with Alshon Jeffery for a 17-yard pass, setting up a Jake Elliott 61-yard field goal attempt with 1 second remaining. Elliott converted on the 61-yard attempt, the longest in Eagles franchise history as time expired. Wentz was quietly efficient in the game, completing 21 of 31 attempts for 176 yards and one touchdown despite playing behind a struggling offensive line. The win came at an expense, as running back Darren Sproles was ruled out for the remainder of the season with a broken arm and torn ACL, both of which occurred on the same play. Despite this injury, the Eagles ran the ball efficiently through most of the game.

With the close win, the Eagles advanced to 2–1 tying the Cowboys and the Redskins for first place in the NFC East while the Giants fell to 0–3 in the basement of the division.

Week 4: at Los Angeles Chargers
The Eagles travelled to the west coast to take on the Los Angeles Chargers. Many Eagles fans invaded StubHub Center making it an unofficial home game for the Eagles (this would later be dubbed "Lincoln Financial Field West" by fans on Twitter). The Eagles jumped out to a 7–0 lead early, after Chris Long forced a fumble to set up an 8-yard touchdown pass from Carson Wentz to Alshon Jeffery. The Eagles would score on their first 5 drives of the game. Chargers quarterback Philip Rivers found Tyrell Williams for a 75-yard touchdown pass, trimming the lead to 13–7 midway through the 2nd quarter. The Eagles responded with a field goal to extend the lead. But, Chargers kicker Younghoe Koo kicked a field goal the change the scoreboard to 16–10 before halftime. The Eagles were up 19–17 when running back Wendell Smallwood ran for a three-yard touchdown, increasing the lead to 26–17. A touchdown drive capped off by Philip Rivers finding second year tight end Hunter Henry with 6:44 left in the game made the score 26–24. Riding LeGarrette Blount and his 136 yards, which included a 68-yard run, the Eagles were able to grind out the remaining time on the clock and hold on for their second close win in a row. The Eagles were overall efficient on offense. The defense played well despite giving up big plays and allowing Philip Rivers to throw 347 yards.

With the win, the Eagles advanced to 3–1 maintaining a narrow one-game lead in the NFC East.

Week 5: vs. Arizona Cardinals

The Eagles scored early and often in this game, for their first blowout win of the season against the Arizona Cardinals. Carson Wentz found tight ends Trey Burton and Zach Ertz for early touchdowns, and later connected with wide receiver Torrey Smith for a 59-yard touchdown to finish the first quarter. Following Smith's touchdown, the Eagles unveiled their baseball home run celebration for the first time all season. The closest the Cardinals came was in the second quarter when they trailed 21–7 following a John Brown 13-yard touchdown. In the mid third quarter, on 3rd and 19, Wentz found wide receiver Nelson Agholor for a 72-yard touchdown pass, on which Agholor juked rookie safety Budda Baker and finished the play with the Nestea Plunge. The final score was 34–7, and Wentz threw for four touchdowns, including three first quarter touchdown passes.

Week 6: at Carolina Panthers
Coming off a 34–7 drubbing of the Arizona Cardinals, the Eagles (4–1) traveled to take on the Carolina Panthers who are also 4–1. The Eagles drove into Panthers territory on their first possession of the game, but a Julius Peppers strip sack against Halapoulivaati Vaitai, who was filling in for a concussed Lane Johnson. The Panthers led 10–3, with their only touchdown coming from a 16-yard touchdown run from quarterback Cam Newton. Late in the second quarter, rookie cornerback Rasul Douglas intercepted Cam Newton deep in Panthers territory, leading to a Zach Ertz 1-yard touchdown reception. The Eagles opened up the second half with another Zach Ertz touchdown, a 17-yard strike from Carson Wentz. Leading 21–16 after three-quarters, the Eagles opened up the fourth quarter with Carson Wentz hooking up with wide receiver Nelson Agholor for a 24-yard touchdown. Cam Newton led the Panthers on a long touchdown drive, trimming the score to 28–23. A late interception by cornerback Jalen Mills and a fourth down stop by the Eagles defense sealed the Eagles fifth victory of the season, and proved they were a legitimate contender in the NFC.

Week 7: vs. Washington Redskins

Following the 28–23 victory on Thursday Night Football against the Panthers, the Eagles returned home for the next 3 games and were once again in a prime time matchup; this time, a Monday Night matchup against the Washington Redskins. The Eagles started off the game in sluggish fashion, and after being backed up over 20 yards due to penalties on their first drive of the game, Carson Wentz threw his fourth interception of the season. After exchanging field goals, Redskins running back Chris Thompson caught a 7-yard touchdown pass from quarterback Kirk Cousins. Wentz and the Eagles responded with an offensive outburst to end the first half. Wentz found rookie wide receiver Mack Hollins for a 64-yard touchdown, and later found tight end Zach Ertz for a four-yard strike to end the first half. The Eagles increased their lead to 24–10 early in the third quarter, with Wentz finding rookie running back Corey Clement on a beautiful throw in the corner of the end zone. The Redskins responded at the end of the third, with Kirk Cousins finding tight end Jordan Reed for a five-yard touchdown. Once again, Wentz led the Eagles down the field, along the way dramatically evading a 3rd-and-8 sack behind the Eagles' 27 and turning it into a 17-yard run, capping off the drive with a 10-yard touchdown to Nelson Agholor. A Jake Elliott field goal later in the quarter opened the lead to 34–17, and the Eagles went on to win 34–24. Wentz once again was in MVP form, completing 17/25 attempts for 268 yards and four touchdowns. However, the win came at a cost, as future Hall of Fame left tackle Jason Peters was lost for the season with a torn ACL, and starting middle linebacker Jordan Hicks was also lost for the season with a ruptured achilles.

With the win, the Eagles improved to 6–1 and swept the Redskins for the first time since 2013.

Week 8: vs. San Francisco 49ers
The Eagles looked to win their 6th game in a row against the winless San Francisco 49ers. The Eagles got off to a slow start, only leading 3–0 after the first quarter. Late in the second quarter, the Eagles blew the game open. Carson Wentz found tight end Zach Ertz for a 1-yard touchdown in the back of the end zone off of a bootleg pass, and Jalen Mills intercepted rookie quarterback C.J. Beathard and returned it 37 yards for a touchdown. The 49ers appeared to have some life in the third quarter, following a Carson Wentz interception, leading to a Matt Breida 22-yard touchdown reception. However, the Eagles responded, with Wentz connecting with Alshon Jeffery for a 53-yard touchdown, putting the game out of reach. The Eagles went on to win 33–10 and advanced to 7–1 on the season. Despite the win, the Eagles played a sloppy game in a rainy afternoon in Philadelphia.

Week 9: vs. Denver Broncos

Heading into the game, there was a lot of hype surrounding new Eagles running back Jay Ajayi who was traded prior to the NFL trade deadline. The Eagles looked to improve to 8–1 for the first time since 2004 as they took on the Denver Broncos. The Denver Broncos named Brock Osweiler as their starting quarterback, replacing Trevor Siemian. The Broncos took their only lead of the game on an opening drive that resulted with a Brandon McManus 53-yard field goal. Despite missing tight end Zach Ertz who was out with a hamstring injury, the Eagles offense didn't miss a beat. On their opening drive of the game, Carson Wentz faked a handoff to newly acquired running back Jay Ajayi, and found Alshon Jeffery wide open for a 32-yard touchdown down the right sideline. Later in the first quarter, slot cornerback Patrick Robinson picked off Brock Osweiler on an intended pass to Demaryius Thomas, setting up a Corey Clement 15-yard touchdown reception, on a screen pass. The Eagles responded to another Brandon McManus field goal with a 27-yard touchdown connection between Wentz and tight end Trey Burton. Following McManus' third field goal of the first half, Jay Ajayi found the end zone for the first time with the Eagles, with a 46-yard touchdown run to close the first half. The Eagles led 31–9 at half time, and following a third quarter touchdown run by Corey Clement and touchdown reception by Alshon Jeffery, the Eagles led 44–9. The final score was 51–23, which was virtually a mirror of their last meeting in 2013, and Corey Clement finished the day with three touchdowns (two rushing, one receiving). With the win, the Eagles went into the bye week with the best start since 2004. They had also surpassed their win total from last season where they only got 7 wins. Furthermore; this was the third largest  victory at Lincoln Financial Field since the 54–11 win over the Bears in 2013 and the largest  victory in the Doug Pederson era.

Week 11: at Dallas Cowboys

The Eagles travelled to Dallas to take on the Dallas Cowboys, who were missing running back Ezekiel Elliott (suspension), left tackle Tyron Smith (groin), and linebacker Sean Lee (hamstring). In a game that the Eagles were expected to dominate, the Eagles started off slow in the first half with Dallas leading 9–7 at halftime. Kicker Jake Elliott was ruled out for the game with a concussion, forcing the Eagles to use backup linebacker Kamu Grugier-Hill for kickoffs, and to go for two-point conversions. The Eagles converted three of four two-point conversions, as their touchdowns came on the ground from both Kenjon Barner and Corey Clement, and through the air, with Carson Wentz finding Torrey Smith for an 11-yard touchdown and Alshon Jeffery for a 17-yard touchdown on fourth down. Late in the fourth quarter, rookie defensive end Derek Barnett notched his second sack of the game, a strip sack of Dak Prescott, leading to a Nigel Bradham 37-yard scoop and score. The Eagles harassed Dak Prescott all game, sacking him four times, intercepting him three times, and forcing one fumble. With this win, the Eagles improved to 9–1 and improved their lead in the NFC East.

Week 12: vs. Chicago Bears

With the Eagles heading into this game at 9–1, they looked to take down the 3–7 Bears. The Eagles blew out the Bears with a final score of 31–3 and improved to 10–1 on the season. The Eagles held the Bears to no first downs in the first half, and led 24–0 at halftime. Zach Ertz became the first Eagles receiver of 2017 to record at least 100 receiving yards in a game, catching 10 passes for 103 yards and a touchdown. Alshon Jeffery had 5 receptions for 52 yards and a touchdown. Nelson Agholor added 3 receptions for 32 yards, including a 15-yard touchdown, and recovered a Jay Ajayi fumble for a touchdown late in the game. Carson Wentz continued his MVP campaign, completing 23 of 36 passes, for 227 yards, and 3 touchdowns. The Eagles defense stymied Mitchell Trubisky and the Bears offense, holding running back Jordan Howard to 6 yards on 7 rushes. Malcolm Jenkins and Corey Graham each added one interception.

Week 13: at Seattle Seahawks

The Eagles struggled throughout this game with penalties and scoring blows that led them losing 24–10 in Seattle. With the loss, the Eagles snapped their 9–game winning streak, lost to Seattle for the fourth time since 2008 and fell to 10–2. The loss dropped them to a tie with the Minnesota Vikings for top seed in the NFC.

Week 14: at Los Angeles Rams

The 10–2 Eagles bounced back from last week's heartbreaking 24–10 loss to Seattle, and for the first time since 2013, the Eagles clinched the NFC East title. However, Carson Wentz suffered an apparent knee injury while trying to dive for a touchdown late in the third quarter. He did throw a touchdown pass to Alshon Jeffery before being ruled out for the game's remainder. The Eagles were already without Darren Sproles, Jason Peters and Jordan Hicks for the rest of the year. Nick Foles would come in and replace Wentz. This was also the first matchup of the Jared Goff-Carson Wentz rivalry. Trailing by two in the final seconds, the Rams attempted a last second comeback through lateral passes, but to no avail as a pass was fumbled with no time left on the clock, and returned by Brandon Graham for one more touchdown to add six to their lead.

With the win, the Eagles advanced to 11–2 and clinched the NFC East. They also got back the #1 seed thanks to a Vikings loss to the Panthers earlier in the day.

The day after the game, Wentz was revealed to have torn his ACL, officially ending his season and making Nick Foles the starting quarterback for the rest of the season.

Week 15: at New York Giants

The Philadelphia Eagles headed into Week 15 of the 2017 NFL season at 11–2. With them clinching the NFC East in Week 14 in a win against the Rams, the Eagles were now fighting for the 1st seed in the NFC playoffs, home-field advantage, and a first-round bye. This was the first week that the Eagles played without MVP candidate Carson Wentz after he went down with a torn ACL in Week 14, ending his season. Backup quarterback, Nick Foles led the Eagles offense for his first time since 2014. The Eagles quickly fell behind 6–0 in the first few minutes of the 1st as Eli Manning and the New York Giants marched down the field and scored on their opening possession. The Eagles responded with a 3-yard pass from Nick Foles to Alshon Jeffery and went up 7–6. Towards the end of the first quarter, the Giants scored again with a 13-yard touchdown pass to Tavarres King to put them up 13–7. In the beginning of the second quarter, the Giants continued to show dominance as Eli Manning threw a 67-yard touchdown pass to put the Giants up 20–7. Nick Foles and the offense would eventually close the gap to bring the Eagles within two points at halftime with the Giants leading 23–21. The Eagles would eventually take the lead with a 28-yard field goal from Jake Elliot to put them up 24–23. In the middle of the fourth, Nelson Agholor caught a 10-yard pass from Nick Foles which gave the Eagles a 31–23 lead. The Giants responded with a score of their own, a 57-yard touchdown pass to Tavarres King which cut the Eagles lead to 31–29 after a failed attempt at a tying 2-point conversion. In the fourth, Jake Elliott hit a 20-yard field goal to put the Eagles up 34–29. The Eagles won the game after defensive stop in their own territory.

With this win, the Eagles improved to a league-best 12–2 and clinched a first-round bye for the first time since 2004.

Despite the win, the defense was dismal against a woeful Giants team that has been decimated with injuries since the two teams met in Week 3.

Week 16: vs. Oakland Raiders
NFL Christmas Games

This game would prove to be the opposite of the previous game as the defense and special teams carried a struggling offense to a 19–10 win over the Oakland Raiders. The Eagles start off solid with a Nick Foles touchdown pass to Jay Ajayi to put them up 7–0, but coming in the second quarter, Derek Carr threw a 36-yard pass to Amari Cooper to tie the game. Jake Elliott missed a 33-yard field goal thus leaving the score 7–7 halftime. In the third quarter, the Raiders would take a 10–7 lead with a Giorgio Tavecchio kick, but the Eagles responded later with a Jake Elliott field goal to tie the game up at 10 after a turnover and pick battle. Defensive efforts and poor offense by both teams caused them to trade punts going into the fourth quarter. Tavecchio missed a 48-yard attempt and Derek Carr would be intercepted a second time, which led to Jake Elliott nailing a 48-yarder of his own to put the Eagles up 13–10. With only 3 seconds left, the Raiders attempted to lateral the ball, but ended up fumbling it, and Derek Barnett ran it back to the end zone as time expired to put up six more points, making the final score 19–10.

With the win the Eagles would improve to 13–2 on the season and clinch the No. 1 seed and home-field advantage throughout the NFC Playoffs.

Despite the achievements, the offense played poorly. The defense stepped up after the Amari Cooper touchdown.

Week 17: vs. Dallas Cowboys

In a meaningless Week 17 game for both teams and a mirror image of last year's season finale, the 13–2 Eagles rested several of their starters against the Dallas Cowboys, while playing others briefly. Nick Foles stayed in for one quarter, struggling to a stat line of 4-of-11 for 39 yards and an interception. Third-string quarterback Nate Sudfeld replaced Foles for the remaining three-quarters, throwing 19 completions in 23 attempts, for 134 yards, no touchdowns, and no interceptions. Dak Prescott's 20-yard touchdown pass to Brice Butler early in the fourth quarter was the only score all game and Dallas narrowly prevailed, 6–0.

With the loss, the Eagles dropped to 13–3 and were unable to set a franchise record for most wins in a 16-game season (the 2017 Eagles tied the 2004 team with 13 wins). It was also the first shutout loss for the Eagles since a 24–0 loss to the Cowboys in Week 17 of the 2009 season. It was also the Eagles' third overall shutout loss at Lincoln Financial Field, and their first since a 42–0 shellacking in 2005 against the Seattle Seahawks. The Eagles were also unable to sweep the NFC East for the first time since 2004.

Despite only playing for a quarter, Foles played poorly for the second straight week. This left many Eagles fans and sportswriters questioning how they would perform in the playoffs, setting the stage for the underdog theme.

Standings

Division

Conference

Team leaders

Postseason

The Eagles entered their first playoff game as the first No. 1 seed since the 1970 Colts to be an underdog in the playoffs. The Eagles relied on their defense to stop the 6th-seeded Atlanta Falcons on their drives to prevail a 15–10 win to advance to the NFC Championship Game.

In that game, against the top-ranked Minnesota Vikings defense, the Eagles defeated the Vikings 38–7 to advance to Super Bowl LII in a Super Bowl XXXIX rematch with the New England Patriots. Foles had his best performance since Week 15, and his third best as an Eagles player, throwing for 352 yards and 4 touchdowns.

The Eagles defeated the Patriots 41–33 to win their first Super Bowl title in franchise history, and their first championship since 1960. During the game, a trick play, known as the Philly Special, was called on 4th and goal just before halftime. During the play, the ball was snapped directly to a running back, who pitched it back to a tight end, who then threw a touchdown pass to the quarterback in the end zone. Nick Foles was named the Super Bowl MVP, the first backup player or quarterback to earn this award. Foles was 28-of-43 of his passes, threw for 373 yards, 3 touchdowns, an interception and even caught a touchdown pass.

Schedule

Game summaries

NFC Divisional Playoffs: vs. (6) Atlanta Falcons

The Philadelphia Eagles entered their first playoff game since 2013 as the first ever number one seed underdog in the divisional round. Following a theme set in the last two games of the regular season, the Eagles relied heavily on their defense, surrendering just 10 points to a strong Falcons offense.

The definitive moment of the game came up on the Atlanta's final drive when the Eagles defense thwarted four Falcons scoring attempts.

On 4th and goal from the 2-yard line, Matt Ryan threw an incomplete pass to Julio Jones, essentially sealing a 15–10 win for the Eagles. Against many analyst predictions, the top seeded Philadelphia Eagles advanced to the NFC Championship game. This marked the first playoff win for the Eagles in nine seasons, and the first major Philadelphia sports franchise to advance in the playoffs since the 76ers defeated the Chicago Bulls in the first round of the 2012 NBA playoffs.

NFC Championship: vs. (2) Minnesota Vikings

The Eagles were once again underdogs going into the NFC Championship Game, this time to the second-seeded Minnesota Vikings, who were coming off a notable playoff victory in the Divisional Round. This was the Eagles' first NFC Championship appearance since the 2008–09 NFL playoffs. Though the Eagles allowed a Vikings touchdown on the opening drive, it was the Vikings' only score. Case Keenum's pick-six to Patrick Robinson changed the game, as the rest of the game represented total domination from Nick Foles and the Eagles' offense, who racked up 456 total yards and 38 unanswered points. With a blowout win against one of the league's top defenses, the Eagles advanced to their third Super Bowl.

Super Bowl LII: vs. (A1) New England Patriots

The Philadelphia Eagles entered Super Bowl LII as a 5.5-point underdog to the defending champions; the New England Patriots. This was also their first appearance in 13 years, with their last Super Bowl berth happening in 2005 (Super Bowl XXXIX), also against the New England Patriots.

In the first quarter, the Eagles managed to score first when Jake Elliott kicked a 25-yard field goal to make the score 3–0. However, the Pats would then tie the game up at 3–3 when Stephen Gostkowski kicked a 26-yard field goal. The Eagles retook the lead when Nick Foles found Alshon Jeffery on a 34-yard pass (with a failed PAT) to make it 9–3 to close out the first quarter. The Eagles increased their lead in the second quarter when LeGarrette Blount ran for a 21-yard touchdown (with a failed 2-point conversion) to make it 15–3. The Pats, however, managed to score twice when Gostkowski kicked a 45-yard field goal, followed up by James White running for a 26-yard touchdown (with a failed PAT) to make it 15–6 and then 15–12. A trick play saw Foles score a receiving touchdown off a 1-yard pass from tight end Trey Burton to make it 22–12 at halftime.

In the third quarter, the Pats drew closer when Tom Brady found Rob Gronkowski on a 5-yard pass to make it 22–19. However, the Eagles managed to pull away again when Foles found Corey Clement on a 22-yard pass to make it 29–19. The Pats closed out the quarter by getting close again when Brady found Chris Hogan on a 26-yard pass to make the score 29–26. In the fourth quarter, the Eagles moved further ahead when Elliott kicked a 42-yard field goal to make the score 32–26. The Pats would finally take the lead when Brady found Gronkowski again on a 5-yard pass to make the score 33–32. The Eagles would respond with a 14-play, 75-yard drive when Foles found Zach Ertz on an 11-yard pass (with a failed 2-point conversion), giving the Eagles the lead, 38–33. On the Patriots' following possession, with 2:16 to play, Brady was sacked by Brandon Graham and fumbled the ball, which was recovered by Derek Barnett at the Patriots' 31-yard line. The Eagles would increase their lead on Elliott's 46-yard field goal to 41–33.

Starting with less than a minute left and no time outs, the Patriots were able to advance the ball almost to midfield. With under 10 seconds remaining, Brady (who had set a Super Bowl passing record of 505 yards) attempted a Hail Mary pass that could have sent the game into overtime with a touchdown and 2-point conversion. However, Gronkowski would be blanketed in the end zone by Eagles defenders, who knocked the ball incomplete as the clock ran out, ending the Patriots' last hope.

With this win, the Eagles won their first Super Bowl and their first NFL title since 1960. Both teams managed to set an all-time NFL record for total combined yards in a game (1,151), and the 74 game points were one short of the Super Bowl record set in 1995.

The Eagles' victory parade took place four days later on February 8, highlighted by a rousing six-minute speech by center Jason Kelce.

Awards and honors

References

Philadelphia
Philadelphia Eagles seasons
Philadelphia Eagles
2017 in Philadelphia
NFC East championship seasons
National Football Conference championship seasons
Super Bowl champion seasons